The FC Basel 1918–19 season was their twenty-sixth season since the club's foundation on 15 November 1893. The club's chairman was August Rossa who took over from Franz Rinderer at the club's AGM. FC Basel played their home games in the Landhof in the district Wettstein in Kleinbasel. World War I was still being fought as the Swiss season started.

Overview 
Otto Kuhn was team captain and acted, so to say, as coach. Basel played a total of 30 matches in their 1918–19 season. 14 of these were in the domestic league and 16 were friendly matches. There were nine test games played in the Landhof and seven away games. Because of the war, all but one of these friendlies were played against Swiss teams. The war ended on 1 November 1918 and six months later, on 18 May 1919 Basel hosted their only foreign opponents, the German team Freiburger FC. Despite an early lead, the game ended in a 1–2 defeat.

Nine of these friendlies were won and six ended in a sporting defeat. The  27 October 1918 was the Football Association day. The Basel teams played a tournament. The match in the afternoon between Basel and Nordstern Basel was abandoned during play, because following a crude foul, the FCB's right half was injured and had to leave the pitch due to his injury. His team then demanded the exclusion of the Nordstern player, who had already been negatively noted during the morning game. The referee did not respond to the request, therefore the entire FC Basel team walked off the pitch. The referee abandoned the game and awarded the victory forfeit 3:0 to Nordstern.

The domestic league, Swiss Serie A 1918–19, was divided into three regional groups, East, Central and West, each group with eight teams. FC Basel and the two other teams from Basel Nordstern and Old Boys were allocated to the Central group. The other teams playing in this group were Aarau, Luzern and Biel-Bienne and the two teams from La Chaux-de-Fonds, Étoile-Sporting and FC La Chaux-de-Fonds. FC Basel did not play a very good season, suffering six defeats. They ended the season in fifth position with 13 points.

In their 14 league games Basel scored 27 goals and conceded 26. Otto Kuhn was the team's best goal scorer netting six times and Ernst Kaltenbach was second best scorer with four goals. Étoile-Sporting won the group, continued to the finals and won the Swiss championship.

Players 
Squad members

Results 

Legend

Friendly matches

Pre and mid-season

Winter break and mid-season

Serie A

Central Group results

Central Group league table

See also
 History of FC Basel
 List of FC Basel players
 List of FC Basel seasons

Sources 
 Rotblau: Jahrbuch Saison 2014/2015. Publisher: FC Basel Marketing AG. 
 Die ersten 125 Jahre. Publisher: Josef Zindel im Friedrich Reinhardt Verlag, Basel. 
 FCB team 1918–19 at fcb-archiv.ch
 Switzerland 1918-19 at RSSSF

References

External links
 FC Basel official site

FC Basel seasons
Basel